The 2013 Tour of Chongming Island is a stage race held in China, with a UCI rating of 2.1. It was the eighth stage race of the 2013 Women's Elite cycling calendar.

Stages

Stage 1
8 May 2013 — Chongbei,

Stage 2
9 May 2013 — Chong West,

Stage 3
10 May 2013 — Chongming,

References

External links

2013 in women's road cycling
2013 in Chinese sport
Tour of Chongming Island